The 1938 Minnesota gubernatorial election took place on November 8, 1938. Republican Party of Minnesota candidate Harold Stassen defeated Farmer–Labor Party incumbent Elmer Benson. Martin A. Nelson and George E. Leach unsuccessfully ran for the Republican nomination, while Hjalmar Petersen unsuccessfully ran for the Farmer-Labor nomination.

Results

Further reading
 Benson, Elmer A. "Politics in My Lifetime." Minnesota History 47 (1980): 154–60. online
 Haynes, John Earl. Dubious alliance: the making of Minnesota's DFL Party (U of Minnesota Press, 1984)
  Kirby, Ales, David G. Dalin and John F. Rothmann. Harold E. Stassen: The Life and Perennial Candidacy of the Progressive Republican (2012) 
 Lovin, Hugh T. "The Fall of Farmer–Labor Parties, 1936-1938." Pacific Northwest Quarterly (1971): 16–26. in JSTOR
 Sofchalk, Donald G. "Union and Ethnic Group Influence in the 1938 Election on the Minnesota Iron Ranges." Journal of the West (2003) 42#3 pp: 66–74.

See also
 List of Minnesota gubernatorial elections

External links
 http://www.sos.state.mn.us/home/index.asp?page=653
 http://www.sos.state.mn.us/home/index.asp?page=657

Minnesota
Gubernatorial
1938
November 1938 events